The mixed team 50 meter pistol event at the 2019 European Games in Minsk, Belarus took place on 24 June at the Shooting Centre.

Schedule
All times are  local (UTC+3).

Results

Qualification

Semifinal

Final

References

Mixed team 50 metre pistol